Brian Stuart Bark (born August 26, 1968) is a former relief pitcher in Major League Baseball who played for the Boston Red Sox in the 1995 season. Bark batted and threw left-handed. He serves as the acting EVP and Chief Information Officer for Sinclair Broadcast Group.

Baseball career

Amateur
Bark attended both Randallstown High School and North Carolina State University, where he played college baseball for the Wolfpack. In 1988 and 1989, he played collegiate summer baseball with the Orleans Cardinals of the Cape Cod Baseball League, and was named a league all-star in 1989. Bark was first drafted by the Baltimore Orioles in the 28th round of the 1989 amateur draft, but did not sign. He was then drafted by the Atlanta Braves in the 12th round of the 1990 amateur draft.

Professional
Bark compiled a career minor league pitching record of 36–29 with 10 saves and a 3.56 ERA over 7 seasons.

In 1995, Bark posted a 0–0 record for the MLB Boston Red Sox with a 0.00 ERA in 2-2/3 scoreless innings pitched over three appearances.

Personal life
Bark received a Bachelor of Arts degree in Communications from North Carolina State University and a Master of Science in Information Systems from UMBC.

Prior to his current role with Sinclair, Bark was a Strategist at Hewlett Packard Enterprise and held various Executive roles at Smiths Group.

References

External links

1968 births
Baseball players from Maryland
Boston Red Sox players
Jewish American baseball players
Jewish Major League Baseball players
Living people
Major League Baseball pitchers
NC State Wolfpack baseball players
Orleans Firebirds players
Richmond Braves players
Sportspeople from Baltimore County, Maryland
Durham Bulls players
Greenville Braves players
Norfolk Tides players
Pawtucket Red Sox players
Pulaski Braves players